The following engagements took place in the year 1864 during the American Civil War. The Union armies, under the command of U.S. Grant, launched multiple offenses in all theaters of the war, in an attempt to prevent Confederate forces from transferring troops from one army to another.

History

In March, Ulysses S. Grant was promoted to lieutenant general and appointed general-in-chief of the Union Army. He decided on a strategy of simultaneous offenses in the Eastern, Western, and Trans-Mississippi Theaters in order to grind down and ultimately defeat the Confederate armies. Grant himself planned to travel with the Army of the Potomac, commanded by George G. Meade, and the IX Corps, commanded by Ambrose Burnside, both to coordinate the two forces and to avoid the politics of Washington, D.C. (Burnside was senior to Meade and therefore would have the right to command the Army of the Potomac, so in order to retain Meade Grant had both commanders report to him. Grant concluded on May 25 that this command structure was unwieldy and placed Burnside under Meade's command.) In the Eastern Theater, Grant's forces fought General Robert E. Lee's Army of Northern Virginia in a series of battles that became known as the Overland Campaign from May to June. Although he lost heavily during the campaign and failed to gain a tactical advantage in any of the battles, Grant inflicted a larger percentage of casualties on Lee than the Union army incurred and also forced Lee into retreating closer to Richmond. Following the Battle of Cold Harbor, Grant crossed the James River and attacked the city of Petersburg, which was a vital rail center for Lee's supply lines to North Carolina. Several Union attacks on the Confederate defenses near the city in early June resulted in failure; as a result, Grant settled into a nine-month siege at Petersburg, during which he continued to move westward in order to cut Lee's supply lines.

 
Grant planned for two other campaigns in the Eastern Theater: the Army of the James commanded by Major General Benjamin Butler landed on the Bermuda Hundred peninsula near Petersburg, with orders to cut the Richmond & Petersburg Railroad and to prevent reinforcements from reaching Lee's army. After building fortifications on the peninsula, Butler made several advances towards the railroad, each time retreating back to his fortifications after a brief skirmish with Confederate forces. Following the Battle of Ware Bottom Church, the Confederates built a line of fortifications parallel to the Union lines, bottling up Butler's force and allowing reinforcements to be detached to Lee.
 
In the Shenandoah Valley, another Union force commanded by Major General Franz Sigel advanced southward until he encountered a small Confederate force commanded by Major General John C. Breckinridge at the Battle of New Market on May 15, which resulted in a Confederate victory. Sigel was replaced by David Hunter, who started his campaign near the end of May. His victory at Piedemont on June 5 caused to Lee to detach his Second Corps, under Lieutenant General Jubal Early, to the Valley to deal with the Union forces. Hunter attacked Early's command at Lynchburg but was defeated; Hunter then retreated through West Virginia to the Ohio River, allowing Early to move north through the Valley. Early then launched a raid on Washington, D.C., but due to the delay caused by the Battle of Monocacy failed to arrive at the city before Union reinforcements did, making a successful attack impossible. Early was then able to retreat back into the Shenandoah Valley with the supplies his army had seized and from there launched several additional small raids which the local Union commanders were unable to prevent. To deal with these raids and combat the Confederate forces in the Valley effectively, Grant consolidated the various military departments in the area into the Middle Military Division, commanded by Philip H. Sheridan. During a three-month campaign, Sheridan successfully destroyed both the Confederate fighting capabilities in the Shenandoah and the supplies the Confederates needed to feed Lee's army at Petersburg.
 
In the Western Theater, Union forces were placed in the Military Division of the Mississippi, commanded by Major General William T. Sherman, who had orders to capture Atlanta. During the three-month Atlanta Campaign, Sherman outflanked Joseph E. Johnston's Army of Tennessee out of one position after another until the two forces reached Atlanta. Fearing he would abandon the city without a fight, Confederate President Jefferson Davis replaced Johnston with John B. Hood, who launched a series of attacks on Sherman's armies, which each time failed with heavy Confederate casualties. When Sherman cut the Montgomery & Atlanta Railroad in early September, the Confederate supply lines into the city were cut and Hood was forced to abandon Atlanta. For the next two months, Hood and Sherman skirmished as Hood attempted to cut Sherman's supply lines to the North; Sherman eventually gave up trying to catch Hood and instead embarked on his Savannah campaign. Hood, instead of following Sherman, moved north into Tennessee, intending to capture Nashville before going into Kentucky. He lost heavily in a frontal attack at the Battle of Franklin on November 30, suffering over 7,000 casualties including thirteen generals killed, wounded, or captured; this left him with too few men to overrun the Union fortifications at Nashville, so Hood instead constructed fortifications a few miles to the south and tried to entice the Union commander, Major General George H. Thomas, to attack him. On December 15–16, Thomas did attack, routing most of the Confederate army on both days and capturing over 70 cannons and 15,000 prisoners. Hood retreated back to Alabama, where he was relieved of command by his own request; the Army of Tennessee was reduced to barely 20,000 men by casualties and desertions during the retreat.
 
In the Trans-Mississippi Theater, Major General Nathaniel P. Banks led his Army of the Gulf up the Red River in Louisiana, intending to invade eastern Texas and to seize cotton to supply the New England cotton mills. The Confederate commander of the District of Western Louisiana, Major General Richard Taylor, steadily retreated until both forces neared Mansfield, where on April 7, Taylor attacked and routed Banks' force; another battle was fought the next day near Pleasant Hill but the Confederates were defeated. Banks continued retreating along the river until he reached the Red River's confluence with the Mississippi. A simultaneous campaign from Union controlled northern Arkansas was launched, which was planned to link up with Banks' force at Shreveport, Louisiana, but was turned back due to a lack of supplies.

Engagements

See also

 1864 in the United States

Notes

References
 Brooksher, William Riley. War Along the Bayous: The 1864 Red River Campaign in Louisiana. Washington, D.C.: Brassey's, 1998. .
 Cooling, B. F. Jubal Early's Raid on Washington 1864. Baltimore, Maryland: The Nautical & Aviation Publishing Company of America, Inc., 1989. .
 Fonvielle, Jr., Chris E. The Wilmington Campaign: Last Rays of Departing Hope. Campbell, California: Savas Publishing Company, 1997. .
 Josephy, Jr., Alvin M. The Civil War in the American West. New York: Alfred A. Knopf, 1992. .
 Kennedy, Frances H. The Civil War Battlefield Guide. New York: Houghton Mifflin, 1998. .
 Knight, Charles R. Valley Thunder: The Battle of New Market and the Opening of the Shenandoah Valley Campaign, May 1864. New York: Savas Beatie, 2010. .
 Parrish, T. Michael. Richard Taylor: Soldier Prince of Dixie. Chapel Hill, North Carolina: University of North Carolina Press, 1992. .
 Sheppard, Jonathan C. By the Noble and Daring of Her Sons: The Florida Brigade of the Army of Tennessee. Tuscaloosa, Alabama: University of Alabama Press, 2012. .
 Stinson, Byron. "Hot Work in Mississippi: The Battle of Tupelo", in Civil War Times Illustrated, Vol. XI, no. 4 (July 1972), pp. 4–9, 46–48. 
 Sword, Wiley. The Confederacy's Last Hurrah: Spring Hill, Franklin, & Nashville. Lawrence, Kansas: University Press of Kansas, 1992. .
 Symonds, Craig L. A Battlefield Atlas of the Civil War. Annapolis, Maryland: The Nautical and Aviation Publishing Company of America, 1983. .
 Trinque, Bruce A. "Rebels Across the River", in America's Civil War, Volume 7, number 4 (September 1994), pp. 38–45, 88. .
 Trudeau, Noah Andre. Bloody Roads South: The Wilderness to Cold Harbor. Boston, Massachusetts: Little, Brown and Company, 1989. .

1864 in the United States
American Civil War timelines
Battles of the American Civil War
Battles 1864